Elvis and the Beauty Queen is a 1981 American made-for-television drama musical film starring Don Johnson and Stephanie Zimbalist.
It aired on NBC on March 1, 1981 at 9pm.

Plot
Don Johnson stars as Elvis Presley in this made-for-TV true story about Elvis's love affair with Linda Thompson (Stephanie Zimbalist), a young beauty pageant contestant who was his live-in girlfriend and traveling companion for four of the last five years of his life. The story begins with their first meeting and traces their years together when Thompson tried to keep Presley off drugs in the last years of his career.

Cast
 Stephanie Zimbalist as Linda Thompson
 Don Johnson as Elvis Presley
 Ann Dusenberry as Jeannie
 Rick Lenz as David Briggs
 Ann Wedgeworth as Aunt Betty 
 Jay W. MacIntosh as Mrs. Thompson
 Ruta Lee as Su-Su
 Edward Edwards as Sam Thompson
 John Crawford as Vernon Presley
 Darrell Fetty as Pete Moore
 Richard Winterstein as Bobby Farr
 Gary Lee Davis as Ray
 John Ashton as Jake
 Bobbi Jordan as Pregnant Woman
 Hanala Sagal as Woman Kissed by Elvis during his concert

Production
Seven songs were recorded for the soundtrack in Nashville, Tennessee, with country singer Ronnie McDowell providing the vocals.  The band that backed Ronnie McDowell was The Glass Hammer, a Nashville-based band.  The Glass Hammer consisted of Joe Meador: Guitar, Don Lee: Lead Guitar, Bill Conn: Keyboards and Horns, Larry Leath: Bass, and Rick Judkins: Drums.

Reception
People Magazine said, "Don Johnson is praiseworthy as the King, but did Elvis really lounge around in tight leather pants and metal-studded capes?"

The Chicago Tribune, reviewing the movie after Johnson became famous for Miami Vice, said, "Every time Don Johnson delivers a line you find yourself rolling onto the floor as you howl with laughter."

References

External links

1981 television films
1981 films
1981 drama films
Films about Elvis Presley
1980s English-language films
NBC network original films
Films directed by Gus Trikonis
American drama television films
1980s American films